Suuremõisa, also "Magnushof" and formerly "Bussby"' is a village in Vormsi Parish, Lääne County, in western Estonia.

References

 

Villages in Lääne County